Flat Island or Ngan Chau is an island located near the north shore of Sai Kung Peninsula of Hong Kong. It is at the mouth of in Hoi Ha Wan and the boundary of Hoi Ha Wan Marine Park.

See also 

 Ngan Chau for other islands with the same Chinese name.

External links

 Map of Hoi Ha Wan Marine Park showing Flat Island (.pdf document)

Uninhabited islands of Hong Kong
Tai Po District
Islands of Hong Kong